Suvhadia Union is an Union Parishad under Fakirhat Upazila of Bagerhat District in the division of Khulna, Bangladesh. It has an area of 72.93 km2 (28.16 sq mi) and a population of 16,221.

References

Unions of Fakirhat Upazila
Unions of Bagerhat District
Unions of Khulna Division